Dennis Gail Peters (April 17, 1937 – April 13, 2020) was an American analytical chemist who specialized in electrochemistry and was named the Herman T. Briscoe Professor at Indiana University in 1975. Peters led his own research group at Indiana University in Bloomington, Indiana until his death in 2020. Peters' research focused on the electrochemical behavior of halogenated organic compounds, more recently moving to focus on transition metal catalysts in regards to the oxidation and reduction of organic species. He authored or co-authored over 210 publications and 5 analytical chemistry textbooks.

Early life and education
Dennis Peters was born on April 17, 1937, in Los Angeles, California. He completed his Bachelor of Science in chemistry from the California Institute of Technology in 1958 and graduated cum laude before completing his PhD in analytical chemistry at Harvard University under James J. Lingane. After completing his PhD in 1962, Peters went to Indiana University in Bloomington, Indiana.

Career
Peters served as the chemistry department's graduate student advisor from 1969 to 1971 where he recruited the department's largest incoming class. His research has focused on the mechanistic and synthetic properties of the oxidation and reduction of halogenated organic compounds and electrocatalysis in organic synthesis. Peters was still actively teaching up to the time he suffered a fall during spring break 2020 and was taken to a hospital.

Death
Peters died from hospital-acquired COVID-19 on April 13, 2020, four days before his 83rd birthday. He contracted the virus while in a Bloomington hospital recovering from a fall. 

Peters' name was included in the May 2020 New York Times tribute U.S. Deaths Near 100,000, An Incalculable Loss to the 100,000 Americans who lost their lives as a direct result of the pandemic. A reporter for the Indiana Daily Student wrote that "Peters had a roaring voice that filled lecture halls".

Awards and honors

1990, American Chemical Society Division of Analytical Chemistry J. Calvin Giddings Award for Excellence in Teaching
2002, Electrochemical Society Henry B. Linford Award for Distinguished Teaching
2006, W. George Pinnell Award for Outstanding Service, Indiana University Bloomington
2007, Elected Fellow of the Electrochemical Society
2012, Electrochemical Society Division of Organic and Biological Electrochemistry, Manuel M. Baizer Award
2012, Elected Fellow of the American Association for the Advancement of Science
2017, Elected Fellow of the American Chemical Society
2020, American Chemical Society Division of Analytical Chemistry, Roland F. Hirsch Award for Distinguished Service

Publications

Books

References

External links
 http://www.indiana.edu/~echem/

Indiana University Bloomington faculty
California Institute of Technology alumni
Harvard University alumni
1937 births
2020 deaths
Writers from Los Angeles
Analytical chemists
20th-century American chemists
Deaths from the COVID-19 pandemic in Indiana